In biology, the BBCH-scale for pome fruit describes the phenological development of fruits such as apples and pears using the BBCH-scale.

The phenological growth stages and BBCH-identification keys of pome fruit are:

1 From terminal bud

References

External links
A downloadable version of the BBCH Scales

BBCH-scale